Rissoina bruguieri, common name Bruguiere's risso, is a species of minute sea snail, a marine gastropod mollusk or micromollusk in the family Rissoinidae.

Spelling
Specific name spelled bruguieri in text and bruguierii in the index, often misspelled (or emended?) bruguierei by subsequent authors following Schwartz (1860) and Locard (1886)

Description

Distribution
This species occurs in the Mediterranean Sea (Greece, south coast of Apulia)

References

 MacDonald & Co (1979). The MacDonald Encyclopedia of Shells. MacDonald & Co. London & Sydney.
 Gofas, S.; Le Renard, J.; Bouchet, P. (2001). Mollusca, in: Costello, M.J. et al. (Ed.) (2001). European register of marine species: a check-list of the marine species in Europe and a bibliography of guides to their identification. Collection Patrimoines Naturels, 50: pp. 180–213

External links

Rissoinidae
Gastropods described in 1826